Restionales is an order of flowering plants. In the Cronquist system (of 1981) it is used for an order (in subclass Commelinidae) and circumscribed as:

 order Restionales
 family Flagellariaceae
 family Joinvilleaceae
 family Restionaceae
 family Centrolepidaceae

The APG II system (2003) assigns the plants involved to the order Poales.

Historically recognized angiosperm orders